The Trinidad and Tobago Electricity Commission Sports Club (better known as the T&TEC Sports Club) is a state-owned football team from Trinidad and Tobago based in Gooding Village. The team was a member of the TT Pro League, the highest level of football in Trinidad.

In May 2012, it was announced that the Trinidad and Tobago Electricity Commission would cut funding to the team due to a shortfall in its annual budget. Peter Mohan, the Sports Club manager suggested that the club would field more TTEC employees as a way of keeping costs down.

Club honours

League honours
 National Super League
 Champions (1): 2010

Cups and trophies
 First Citizens Cup
 Runners-up (1): 2011
 TOYOTA Classic
 Runners-up (1): 2011

External links
Profile on Soca Warriors Online
Profile on ttproleague

References

Football clubs in Trinidad and Tobago
Works association football teams